The Virgin Queen is a 1728 tragedy by the British writer Richard Barford.

The original cast featured Lacy Ryan as Pallantus, James Quin as Artaxerses, William Milward as Eumenes, Anthony Boheme as Phraotes, Thomas Chapman as Mirza, Thomas Walker as Arsamnes and Elizabeth Younger as Artesia.

References

Bibliography
 Burling, William J. A Checklist of New Plays and Entertainments on the London Stage, 1700-1737. Fairleigh Dickinson Univ Press, 1992.
 Nicoll, Allardyce. History of English Drama, 1660-1900, Volume 2. Cambridge University Press, 2009.

1728 plays
British plays
West End plays
Tragedy plays